Carl Turner may refer to:

People
Carl Turner (DJ), part of Bizarre Inc
Carl Turner Road, see New York State Route 9M
Carl Turner, Rector of St. Thomas Church, New York
Carl Turner, owner of Florida Digital Newspaper Library
Carl Turner (politician), member of the Kansas House of Representatives
Carl C. Turner, United States Army Provost Marshal General

Fictional characters
Carl Turner, character played by Fred Essler
Carl Turner, character in Cult of the Cobra
Carl Turner, character played by Jason Bernard

See also
Karl Turner (disambiguation)